The Andorran Permanent Representative to the United Nations Office at Geneva has his residence in Andorra La Vella and is also accredited as Observer to the World Trade Organization.

List of heads of mission

References 

Andorra
Andorra and the United Nations